Quinqueremulus is a genus of flowering plants in the family Asteraceae.

There is only one known species, Quinqueremulus linearis, endemic to Western Australia.

References

Monotypic Asteraceae genera
Gnaphalieae
Endemic flora of Western Australia
Taxa named by Paul G. Wilson